Davenport may refer to:

Places

Australia
Davenport, Northern Territory, a locality
Hundred of Davenport, cadastral unit in South Australia
Davenport, South Australia, suburb of Port Augusta
District Council of Davenport, former local government area near Port Augusta
Corporate Town of Davenport, former local government municipality near Port Augusta
Electoral district of Davenport, in South Australia

Canada
Davenport (electoral district), a federal electoral district
Davenport (provincial electoral district), in Ontario
Davenport, Toronto, a neighbourhood and former village in Toronto
Davenport Road, Toronto

United Kingdom
Davenport, Cheshire
Davenport, Greater Manchester

United States
Davenport, Iowa, the largest city of that name in the US
Davenport, California
Davenport, Florida
Davenport, Nebraska
Davenport, New York
Davenport Center, New York
Davenport, North Dakota
Davenport, Oklahoma
Davenport, Virginia
Davenport, Washington
Davenport Creek, a stream in Utah
Davenport Glacier, in North Cascades National Park, Washington
Davenport Lake, a lake in Georgia
Davenport Municipal Airport (Washington)
Davenport Neck, a peninsula in New York

Education
Davenport College, a residential college at Yale University
Davenport University, a college in Michigan

Furniture
Davenport (sofa), a series of sofas, now a genericized trademark for "sofa"
Davenport desk, an antique desk form

Music
The Davenports, a rock band from New York, formed in 2000

People
Davenport (surname), a list of people with the name

Characters
Achilles Davenport, a character from the video game Assassin's Creed III
Davenport, the surname of several characters from the T.V. series Lab Rats
Lucas Davenport, created by novelist John Sandford
Lieutenant Colonel Alvin H. "Chopper" Davenport, a character from the video game Ace Combat 5: The Unsung War
Ashley Davenport, a character in Revenge (TV series)
Cooter Davenport, a character in the American TV series The Dukes of Hazzard
Dave Davenport, a character from the online webcomic Narbonic
Dawn Davenport, the main character played by Divine in the John Waters film, Female Trouble
Gemma Davenport, a character from British soap opera Coronation Street
Henry Davenport, a character from the comedy series Drop the Dead Donkey
Mrs. Davenport, a character from the animated cartoon Jimmy Neutron
Davenport, a character from the McElroy family's podcast The Adventure Zone
Hubert Davenport, a character from the British children's comedy Rentaghost
Andrea Davenport, a character from the Disney Channel animated series The Ghost and Molly McGee

Science and mathematics
Davenport constant
Davenport diagram, a graphical tool used in acid base physiology
Davenport rotations, a mathematical decomposition of a matrix as a set of chained rotations

Other uses
Davenport Locomotive Works, an American locomotive manufacturer
Davenport Pottery, a manufacturer of pottery in Longport, Staffordshire in the Nineteenth Century
USS Davenport (PF-69), a Tacoma-class frigate

See also 
Devonport (disambiguation)
Davenport Hotel (disambiguation)